There's a Party Goin' On is a studio album by country music and rockabilly singer Wanda Jackson. It was released in January 1961 by Capitol Records (catalog no. ST-1511). The album cover calls it "a collection of great country songs in the rhythmic singing style of Wanda Jackson."

AllMusic gave the album a rating of four stars. Reviewer Richie Unterberger called it "a pretty solid and energetic set" including "lightning-speed rockabilly riffing by Roy Clark."

Track listing
Side A
 "There's a Party Goin' On" (Don Covay, John Berry) [2:02]
 "Lonely Week-Ends" (Charlie Rich) [2:20]
 "Kansas City" (Jerry Leiber, Mike Stoller) [2:40]
 "Bye Bye Baby" (Jule Styne, Leo Robin) [2:05]
 "Fallin'" (Howard Greenfield, Neil Sedaka) [2:50]
 "Hard Headed Woman" (Claude DeMetruis) [1:55]

Side B
 "Tongue Tied" (Don Covay, John Berry, Mark Lewis) [2:22]
 "It Doesn't Matter Anymore" (Paul Anka) [2:50]
 "Tweedle Dee" (Winfield Scott) [2:40]
 "Sparkling Brown Eyes" (Bill Cox) [2:35]
 "Lost Week End" (Wayne Walker) [2:15]
 "Man We Had a Party" (Jessie Mae Robinson) [1:58]

References

1961 albums
Wanda Jackson albums
Capitol Records albums